Blagodarny (masculine), Blagodarnaya (feminine), or Blagodarnoye (neuter) is the name of several inhabited localities in Russia.

Modern localities
Urban localities
Blagodarny, Stavropol Krai, a town in Blagodarnensky District of Stavropol Krai

Rural localities
Blagodarny, Rostov Oblast, a khutor in Mikhaylovskoye Rural Settlement of Tselinsky District of Rostov Oblast
Blagodarnoye, Krasnodar Krai, a selo in Blagodarnensky Rural Okrug of Otradnensky District of Krasnodar Krai
Blagodarnoye, Tashlinsky District, Orenburg Oblast, a selo in Blagodarnovsky Selsoviet of Tashlinsky District of Orenburg Oblast
Blagodarnoye, Tyulgansky District, Orenburg Oblast, a selo in Blagodarnovsky Selsoviet of Tyulgansky District of Orenburg Oblast

Renamed localities
Blagodarnoye, former name of Blagodarny, a town in Blagodarnensky District of Stavropol Krai